Rako District is a district in the northeastern Bari region of Somalia. Its capital lies at Rako.

References

Districts of Somalia
Bari, Somalia